Jason Aldean (born Jason Aldine Williams; February 28, 1977) is an American country music singer. Since 2005, he has been signed to Broken Bow Records, a record label for which he has released ten albums and 40 singles. His 2010 album, My Kinda Party, is certified quadruple-platinum by the Recording Industry Association of America (RIAA). His 2012 album Night Train is certified double-platinum, while his 2005 self-titled debut, 2007 album Relentless, 2009 album Wide Open, 2014 album Old Boots, New Dirt are all certified platinum. Aldean has received five Grammy Award nominations throughout his career, twice for Best Country Album.

27 of his 38 singles have reached #1 on either the Hot Country Songs or Country Airplay charts with "Why", "She's Country", "Big Green Tractor", "The Truth", "Don't You Wanna Stay" (a duet with Kelly Clarkson), "Dirt Road Anthem", "Fly Over States", "Take a Little Ride", "The Only Way I Know" (a collaboration with Luke Bryan and Eric Church), "Night Train", "When She Says Baby", "Burnin' It Down", "Just Gettin' Started", "Tonight Looks Good on You", "Lights Come On", "A Little More Summertime", "Any Ol' Barstool", "You Make It Easy", "Drowns the Whiskey" (a duet with Miranda Lambert), "Girl Like You", "Rearview Town", "Got What I Got", "Blame It on You", "If I Didn't Love You" (a duet with Carrie Underwood), and "Trouble with a Heartbreak".

Early life
Jason Aldine Williams was born in Macon, Georgia, on February 28, 1977. His parents separated when he was three. He was raised by his mother in Macon, and during the summer he spent time with his father in Homestead, Florida. Before his father went to his work, he would map out guitar chords on notebook paper to show his son where to place his fingers to play the chords and Jason would sit and practice all day while his dad was at work. When his dad got home, he got out his own guitar and they played together. Soon he could play a song after hearing it only a few times. His early favorites included George Strait's "The Cowboy Rides Away", Hank Williams Jr.'s "The Blues Man", and Alabama's "My Home's in Alabama".

Both of his parents encouraged young Aldean as he progressed musically. From age 14, after watching the country-music awards on television, he wanted to perform on stage. With his mother's help, he performed at the local VFW hall in Macon. He sang John Anderson's song "Seminole Wind" and Tracy Lawrence's "Sticks and Stones". He then began performing at area talent contests and local fairs. At 15, he joined the "house band" at Georgia nightspot Nashville South.

In order to stand out, Aldean changed the spelling of his middle name, Aldine, to come up with the name Aldean.

Musical career

1998–2004: Career beginnings
After high school, with his father's help, Aldean and his band performed at clubs and festivals around the Southeast. With Justin Weaver (one of the band's members), Aldean began writing and recording original songs. In 1998, he performed songs from his first album at a showcase staged by Atlanta nightclub The Buckboard. He was approached by Michael Knox, then of the Warner-Chappell song-publishing company. After signing with Warner-Chappell, Aldean moved to Nashville on November 1, 1998, at the age of 21.

Aldean was offered a recording contract but was subsequently dropped. He signed with another label but again was dropped in 2000 after his label postponed his recording sessions repeatedly. Various showcases failed to bring him a contract. The last straw was an attempt at the Wildhorse Saloon where the promised label talent scouts never even showed up. Still frustrated and discouraged with his struggling career, Aldean gave himself six months before planning to leave Nashville and return home to Georgia.  Then five weeks later, he was offered a deal from Broken Bow Records in Nashville. Shortly after the release of his self-titled debut album, Aldean picked up his new (and current) agent Kevin Neal. Furthermore, while recording Relentless, Aldean moved to Clarence Spalding and Spalding Entertainment for management.

2005–2008: Jason Aldean and Relentless
Aldean's debut single, "Hicktown", was released in early 2005. It served as the lead-off to his self-titled debut album and reached number 10 on the US Billboard Hot Country Songs chart. The album also produced his first number one hit with "Why". This album finally released the number 4 hit "Amarillo Sky", which had previously been a non-charting single in 2002 for McBride & the Ride. This song earned a 2006 ACM nomination for Song of the Year and Video of the Year. Aldean earned the title "Top New Male Vocalist" at the 2006 ACM Awards. The album has sold over 1,000,000 copies in the United States and was certified platinum by the RIAA in 2007.

Aldean spent most of January 2007, in the studio with producer Michael Knox to finish his second album, Relentless. This album was released on May 29, 2007, and at Wal-Mart locations, it was released with a Limited Edition CMT Pick DVD that included Aldean's performances. The album's lead-off single, "Johnny Cash", was originally recorded by Tracy Byrd, but Aldean's version of it peaked at No. 6. Its followup "Laughed Until We Cried" became his 5th consecutive Top 10 hit. Relentless has also been certified platinum by the RIAA, and its title track was released as its 3rd single. The song has also been Aldean's lowest-charting single both in the U.S. and Canada, failing to reach the Top 10 on the country charts.

2009–2012: Wide Open and My Kinda Party
Aldean released his seventh single titled "She's Country" on December 1, 2008. This song serves as the lead-off single from his third album Wide Open, which was released on April 7, 2009. The single debuted at No. 51 on the Hot Country Songs chart in late-November 2008. Being his 7th consecutive Top 40 hit on the country charts, it is also his 1st Top 40 hit on the Billboard Hot 100. It later became his second number-one hit, and his first since "Why" in May 2006. The next single, "Big Green Tractor", became Aldean's third number-one hit. Wide Open debuted at No. 2 on the Top Country Albums chart. "The Truth" became the album's third consecutive number-one hit in January 2010, with "Crazy Town" being the album's fourth single and peaking at No. 2 on the country charts.

Aldean performed with Bryan Adams on an episode of CMT Crossroads in the beginning of May, and the episode premiered on June 26, 2009. In an interview with Shave Magazine, Aldean explained that working with Bryan on Crossroads "was great" and that "[h]e was a lot of fun." But the real highlight for him was that he was working with Randy Owen. "I am a big fan of Alabama so I got a chance to work with Randy Owen on this album (it didn't make the album but it eventually made a bonus track). It was really cool. Alabama were like 'The Beatles' for me so working with him was definitely one of the highlights," he said "I mean, both of those guys were really cool moments, but if I had to pick one highlight, it would be working with Randy [Owen] this year." A live DVD titled Wide Open Live & More was released on August 25, 2009. At the 2010 CMT Music Awards, Aldean picked up 3 nominations in Video of the Year and Male Video of the Year for "The Truth", as well as Collaborative Video of the Year and CMT Performance of the Year for his performance of "Heaven" with Bryan Adams.

In August 2010, Aldean released the single  "My Kinda Party", which entered the Hot Country Songs chart at No. 41. It is the lead-off single from his album of the same name, which was released on November 2, 2010. It marks as Aldean's tenth top-10 country hit. Aldean also collaborated with Kelly Clarkson on the intimate duet "Don't You Wanna Stay". His and Clarkson's performance on November 10, 2010, at the CMA Awards received positive recognition, and debuted at No. 59 on Billboards Hot Country Songs chart from unsolicited airplay for the week of November 20, 2010. In March 2011, it became Aldean's fifth number-one hit.

In early 2011, Aldean's version of "Dirt Road Anthem", which was recorded previously by both of its writers country rap artist Colt Ford and Brantley Gilbert (who also wrote "My Kinda Party"), debuted on the Hot Country Songs chart at No. 57 as an album cut  from an unsolicited airplay for the week of February 5, 2011. In March 2011, the song was chosen as the third single from My Kinda Party. Aldean also collaborated with Ludacris for the song at the 2011 CMT Music Awards in Nashville, Tennessee on June 8, 2011. In addition to making #1 on the Hot Country Songs chart for the week of July 30, 2011, it also became Aldean's first Top 10 hit on the Hot 100 chart.

Aldean performed "My Kinda Party" at the start of the 2011 Home Run Derby, which was broadcast on ESPN. Aldean won the CMA award for Album of the Year in 2011 as well as the Musical Event of the Year with "Don't You Wanna Stay", his duet with Kelly Clarkson. This was his first win. On October 25, 2011, it was announced that Aldean would be performing on The Grammy Nominations Concert Live! – Countdown to Music's Biggest Night, the 1-hour special which took place live on Wednesday, November 30, 2011, at the Nokia Theatre in Los Angeles. "Don't You Wanna Stay" received a Grammy nomination for Best Country Duo/Group Performance, but however lost to The Civil Wars at the 54th Grammy Awards on February 12, 2012. The fourth single from the album was "Tattoos on This Town", which peaked at No. 2, followed by yet another number one single, entitled "Fly Over States".

2012–2016: Night Train and Old Boots, New Dirt

The first single from Aldean's fifth album was entitled "Take a Little Ride". It was released on July 16, 2012. Later, the album's title was announced as Night Train. This album was released on October 16, 2012. Its second single, "The Only Way I Know", is a collaboration among him, Luke Bryan, and Eric Church. The album's third single, entitled "1994", is a tribute to Joe Diffie. The album's fourth single, the title track, was released to country radio on June 24, 2013. The fifth single, "When She Says Baby", was released to country radio on November 18 of that same year. "Take a Little Ride", "The Only Way I Know", "Night Train", and "When She Says Baby" all peaked at number 1 on the Country Airplay chart respectively.

During a radio interview on May 18, Aldean hinted at another possible collaboration with Ludacris. He did state that it would not be on Night Train. On December 16, 2014, Ludacris released an Extended Play titled Burning Bridges, in which the title track featured him and Aldean as a duet. Aldean performed "My Kinda Party" during the People's Choice Awards on January 9, 2013. On June 5, 2013, Jason Aldean co-hosted the 2013 CMT Music Awards with actress Kristen Bell. He and Lenny Kravitz opened the awards show singing "American Woman".

On July 22, 2014, Aldean released a new single "Burnin' It Down". This song would serve as the lead single off his sixth studio album Old Boots, New Dirt, which was released on October 7, 2014. This song reached No. 1 both on the Hot Country Songs and Country Airplay charts. The album's second single, "Just Gettin' Started", was released to country radio on November 10, 2014. It reached No. 1 on the Country Airplay chart in March 2015. "Tonight Looks Good on You" was released as the third single on March 23, 2015. It reached No. 1 on the Country Airplay chart in July 2015. also performed CMT Crossroads with Bob Seger song called "Turn the Page". The album's fourth single, "Gonna Know We Were Here" released to country radio on August 17, 2015. It reached No. 2 on the Country Airplay chart in January 2016. Jason Aldean is one of only three artists to achieve RIAA platinum sales certification on an album released this year. His Old Boots, New Dirt album, which debuted at the top of Billboard's all-genre Top 200 chart in October, has now shipped more than one million units. This means that he is the only country star to release a platinum-seller in 2014, and joins only Taylor Swift and Ariana Grande in platinum album certifications for collections released this year.

At the conclusion of Aldean's Burn it Down Tour, he donated over $600,000 to Susan G. Komen for the Cure of South Florida.

2016–2018: They Don't Know and Rearview Town
In July 2016 it was announced that the seventh regular studio album, They Don't Know, was set for release on September 9 of that year. Again produced by Michael Knox, the album was preceded by the single "Lights Come On", released to country radio on April 1, 2016. The album's second single, "A Little More Summertime", released to country radio on July 15, 2016. The album's third single, "Any Ol' Barstool", was released to country radio on December 5, 2016. The album's fourth and final single, the title track of the album, was released to country radio on May 8, 2017. At the 2016 ACM Awards, Aldean was awarded Entertainer of the Year for the first time in his career. He would go on to win that award in 2017 and also 2018.

In March 2017, Aldean announced that he is working on his eighth album, titled Rearview Town, which was released on April 13, 2018. The lead single, "You Make It Easy", was released on January 26, 2018. Aldean also confirmed two other songs would appear on the album: "Gettin' Warmed Up" and "Set It Off".

On October 1, 2017, Aldean had just begun performing "When She Says Baby" at the Route 91 Harvest music festival on the Las Vegas Strip in Paradise, Nevada when Stephen Paddock began firing into the crowd from the 32nd floor of the Mandalay Bay Resort. Aldean and his band managed to exit the stage unharmed, but 60 concertgoers died and 867 others were injured during the incident. On October 7, Aldean opened Saturday Night Live with words of support for those hurting in the aftermath of the shooting, saying that "we witnessed one of the worst tragedies in American history. Like everyone, I'm struggling to understand what happened that night (and why) and how to pick up the pieces and start to heal. But you can be sure that we're going to walk through these tough times together, every step of the way. Because when America is at its best, our bond and our spirit — it's unbreakable." He then performed a cover of "I Won't Back Down" by Tom Petty, who had died five days earlier.

2019-present: 9, Macon, Georgia and "Christmas in Dixie"
Aldean performed at the 2019 Musicians Hall of Fame and Museum Concert and Induction Ceremony. Aldean's ninth album, titled 9, was released on November 22, 2019. The album's first single, "We Back" released to country radio on September 9, 2019. It peaked at number 6 on the Country Airplay in March 2020 and number 1 on the Canadian Country chart. The album's second single, "Got What I Got" released to country radio on April 6, 2020. "Blame It on You" was released on October 26, 2020 as the album's third single.

On July 23, 2021, Aldean released the single "If I Didn't Love You", featuring Carrie Underwood. It was the leadoff single to his tenth studio album, a double album project entitled Macon, Georgia. The first half, Macon, was released on November 12, 2021. On January 14, 2022, "Trouble with a Heartbreak" was released as the album's second single and was the leadoff single to the second half of the album, Georgia, which was released on April 22, 2022. On March 25, 2022, Aldean and Brantley Gilbert released the single "Rolex® on a Redneck". On July 18, 2022, Aldean released the single "That's What Tequila Does" to country radio, from the double album "Macon, Georgia". In November 2022, Aldean released his version of Alabama's "Christmas in Dixie"

Philanthropy and impact
Jason has been an avid supporter of raising awareness for breast cancer research since 2004, after losing a dear friend to the disease. He has raised close to $4M for cancer research through donating a portion of each ticket sale, special merchandise, VIP meet & greets, a donate button on his website, and his annual Concert for the Cure, most of which he has contributed to Susan G. Komen for the Cure.

Band members
Jason Aldean - vocals, guitar, piano
Tully Kennedy - bass guitar, backing vocals
Kurt Allison - guitar
Rich Redmond - drums
Carl Ray Jackson - pedal steel guitar
Jack Sizemore - guitar, backing vocals

Personal life
Aldean married Jessica Ann Ussery on August 4, 2001. Together, the couple have a daughter born in 2003, and another born in 2007. On September 30, 2012, Aldean admitted to having "acted inappropriately at a bar" with former American Idol contestant, Brittany Kerr, responding to reports linking her and Aldean. In a statement, Kerr said she had suffered "a lapse in judgment" and "would like to sincerely apologize to everyone that has been affected by this." Aldean filed for divorce on April 26, 2013, citing irreconcilable differences and listing the filing date as the formal separation date.

Aldean and Kerr began dating and made their first public appearance as a couple at the 2014 CMT Awards. On September 24, 2014, Aldean and Kerr announced their engagement. The couple were married on March 21, 2015. Their son, Memphis was born on December 1, 2017. Their daughter, Navy was born in early 2019. In August 2022, Brittany Aldean posted an Instagram video in which she stated, "I’d really like to thank my parents for not changing my gender when I went through my tomboy phase", followed by a longer post in which she stated an opposition to  "sex changes"  for minors. She received support from other country singers such as RaeLynn and Whitney Duncan, while Cassadee Pope and Maren Morris criticized the remarks as indicative of transphobia. In response, Aldean's public relations firm The GreenRoom dropped him as a client on September 1.

Aldean owns a hunting company called Buck Commander, in partnership with former Major League Baseball (MLB) players Adam LaRoche, Ryan Langerhans, and Tom Martin; Willie Robertson of Duck Dynasty; and fellow country singers Luke Bryan and Tyler Farr.

In 2015, Forbes estimated Aldean's annual income at $43.5 million. Aldean was the seventh highest-earning country musician making about 32.5 million dollars in 2017. In 2017, Aldean was on Forbes' Celebrity 100 list, being ranked at 98. Aldean became the sixth artist to receive the ACM Dick Clark Artist of the Decade Award in 2019. The award is given to artists who were consistently on top of the charts over the span of the decade.

Discography

Studio albums
Jason Aldean (2005)
Relentless (2007)
Wide Open (2009)
My Kinda Party (2010)
Night Train (2012)
Old Boots, New Dirt (2014)
They Don't Know (2016)
Rearview Town (2018)
9 (2019)
Macon (2021)
Georgia (2022)

ToursHeadlining2008: CMT ON TOUR: Relentless
2010: Wide Open Tour
2011–12: My Kinda Party Tour
2013: Night Train Tour
2013–15: Burn It Down Tour
Twelve shows in 2015 were merge with Kenny Chesney, The Big Revival Tour)
2015–16: We Were Here/Six String Circus Tour
2017: They Don't Know Tour
2018: High Noon Neon Tour
2019: Ride All Night Tour
2020: We Back Tour
2021: Back in the Saddle Tour
2022: Rock N' Roll Cowboy Tour
2023: Highway Desperado TourSupporting'''
2006: Me and My Gang Tour (with Rascal Flatts)
2007: Still Feels Good Tour (with Rascal Flatts)
2007: Free and Easy Summer Tour (with Dierks Bentley and Miranda Lambert)
2008: Live Your Voice Tour (with Tim McGraw)
2010: Last Rodeo Tour (with Brooks & Dunn)

FilmographyCMT Crossroads with Bryan Adams (2009), Bob Seger (2014)Sweet Vengeance (2013)CMT Music Awards (2013): Co-Host with Kristen BellThe Voice'' (Fall 2021): Advisor for Team Kelly

Awards and nominations

Grammy Awards

Other awards

References

82. ^ Aldean, Jason. (2021).  https://www.instagram.com/p/CSFCUKRLKEw/?igshid=YmMyMTA2M2Y=

External links

 
 

1977 births
2017 Las Vegas shooting
21st-century American male singers
21st-century American singers
American country rock singers
American country rock musicians
American country singer-songwriters
American male singer-songwriters
BBR Music Group artists
Bro-country singers
Country musicians from Georgia (U.S. state)
Country musicians from Tennessee
Country pop musicians
Crime witnesses
Living people
Musicians from Macon, Georgia
Singer-songwriters from Georgia (U.S. state)
Singer-songwriters from Tennessee